Robert Webb Hargrave (May 8, 1920 – July 28, 2014) was an American football player for the University of Notre Dame.

As a quarterback for Reitz Memorial High School in Evansville, Indiana, Hargrave led his team to a record of 32-0-5.

At the University of Notre Dame, Hargrave became the starting quarterback for Elmer Layden's final season as head coach in 1940.  He would post a 7-2 record and earn Honorable Mention All-American honors.  After graduation, he spent four years serving in the United States Navy during World War II.  On November 11, 1944, he married Florence Molyneaux in San Francisco, California.

Following the war, the couple moved to Florence's home town of Chicago, Illinois, where their first two children were born.  In 1948, Hargrave moved his family back to Evansville, where they had five additional children.

Hargrave was inducted into the Indiana Football Hall of Fame on November 30, 1979.

See also

References

 Bob Hargrave's profile at the Indiana Football Hall of Fame
 Florence M. Hargrave obituary
 U.S. Public Records Index

1920 births
Sportspeople from Evansville, Indiana
American football quarterbacks
Notre Dame Fighting Irish football players
United States Navy personnel of World War II
2014 deaths